Marc Pachter (born 1942 or 1943) is an American museum director who headed up the United States National Portrait Gallery from 2000 until 2007 and was the acting director (after coming back out of retirement) of the National Museum of American History between 2011 and 2012, both at the Smithsonian.

While at the NPG Pachter played an instrumental role in acquiring the Lansdowne portrait for the museum.
When he retired as director of the National Portrait Gallery in 2007, in turn the Gallery commissioned a portrait by Robert Liberace of him.

Pachter gave a talk entitled "The Art of the Interview" at the EG conference in January 2008; a video of the talk is posted on the TED website.

In February 2008, Pachter was a guest on the Colbert Report in which he discussed with Stephen Colbert, the host's portrait hanging in the National Portrait Gallery and the effect it was having upon attendance at the museum.

References

External links
 Video of Pachter's EG2008 talk from the TED website
 

Directors of museums in the United States
Living people
1940s births